The Kikai language is spoken on Kikai Island, Kagoshima Prefecture of southwestern Japan. It is debated whether it is a single dialect cluster. Regardless, all Kikai dialects are members of the Amami–Okinawan languages, which are part of the Japonic languages.

Classification

The classification of Kikai is disputed. Some even dispute the existence of the Kikai cluster.

The languages of the Amami Islands can be divided into the conservative northern group (Northern Amami Ōshima, Southern Amami Ōshima and Tokunoshima) and the innovative southern group (Okinoerabu and Yoron). The problem here is which Kikai belongs to.

It has been noted that northern communities of Kikai are phonologically more conservative and show some similarity to Amami Ōshima and Tokunoshima while the rest of the island is closer to Southern Amami. For example, Northern Kikai retains seven vowels, /a/, /e/, /i/, /o/, /u/, /ɨ/ and /ɘ/ while South–Central Kikai only has five vowels. /k/ is palatalized into /t͡ɕ/ before /i/ in South–Central Kikai but not in Northern Kikai.

For this reason, Nakamoto (1976) disassembled Kikai into two:

By contrast, Karimata (2000) tentatively supported the Kikai cluster in consideration of other shared phonological features. Lawrence (2011) argued that lexical evidence supported the Kikai cluster although he refrained from determining its phylogenetic relationship with other Amami dialects.

Pellard (2018) presented a drastically different classification. Based on the irregular sound change *kaja>gja for thatch, he grouped Tokunoshima, Okinoerabu, and Yoron into a clade, and treated Amami Ōshima, Kikai, and the resultant clade as the primary branches of Amami.

Internal classification
There are 33 local communities on Kikai Island. Despite being a small, flat island, Kikai shows considerable variations in lexicon, phonology and morphology. The languages on the island are mutually intelligible. The northern communities of Onotsu, Shitooke (and Sateku) are phonologically more conservative than the rest of the island.

Folk terminology
Iwakura Ichirō (1904–1943), a folklorist from Aden, stated that a language of Kikai Island was called  in the language of Aden.

Phonology
The following is the phonology of the Onotsu dialect, which is based on Shirata (2013b).

As with most Ryukyuan languages to the north of Central Okinawan, stops are described as "plain" C’ and "glottalized" C‘. Phonetically, the two series are aspirated  and tenuis , respectively.

Northern Kikai

Consonants

Vowels
In more conventional interpretations, two more vowels /ɨ/ and /ɘ/ are added.

South–Central Kikai
The following is the phonology of the Kamikatetsu dialect, which is based on Shirata (2013a).

Consonants

Vowels

References

Sources
Kikaijima hōgen-shū (1977[1941]) by Iwakura Ichirō. A dictionary for the author's home community, Aden, and a couple of other southern communities on Kikai Island of the Amami Islands.
Research Data on the Kikaijima Dialects Written in Kana (2012) edited by Ogawa Shinji. Contains basic vocabulary and sentences collected in nine communities of Kikai.

External links 
Research Report on the Kikaijima Dialects published by the National Institute for Japanese Language and Linguistics (in Japanese)
ELAR archive of Linguistic data of Kikai-Ryukyuan

Culture in Kagoshima Prefecture
Ryukyuan languages
Languages of Japan